Mission Hill is an American adult animated sitcom that ran on The WB from September 24, 1999, to July 16, 2000, and on Cartoon Network's Adult Swim from May 26 to August 11, 2002.

While initially garnering poor ratings, it has since gained a cult following, and is also popular outside of the United States and Canada, receiving broadcasts in Australia, Eastern Europe, Latin America, Spain and New Zealand.
Stylistically, the series is recognizable for its bright, neon color palette, and features a peculiar mixture of modern animation and traditional "cartoonish" drawings (dashed lines coming from eyes to indicate line of vision, red bolts of lightning around a spot in pain). The style was made to be reminiscent of 1930s rubber hose cartoons like Fleischer Studios, Walt Disney, Warner Bros., and MGM, as well as mid-century modern cartoons with the likes of Hanna-Barbera, UPA, Jay Ward, and The Pink Panther. The designs were done by Lauren MacMullan, who cites the comic series Eightball as her source of inspiration for her overall design.

History
Mission Hill was conceived in 1997 by Bill Oakley and Josh Weinstein, former executive producers/showrunners of The Simpsons, with the original artistic designer being Lauren MacMullan. Oakley has mentioned that one of the main inspirations for Mission Hill was the 1997 MTV series Austin Stories, which followed a group of 20-somethings in Austin, Texas. After failed pitches to Fox and NBC, the rights to Mission Hill were purchased by Warner Bros. and the WB in the fall of 1997, following a successful pitch to Garth Ancier, the then-head of programming at the WB. At the pitch, network executives from the WB were presented with three designs for Andy, Jim, Kevin and Posey. One depicted them in a drastically different, more cartoonish art style; the other two drew closer resemblance to the final designs, but one featured slightly more realistic designs for Andy and Kevin, with another featuring less realistic designs for Jim and Posey. When one of the WB executives saw the alternate designs for Jim and Posey, he thought that they were the parents of Andy and Kevin.<ref name="sp">"From Concept to Creation" special feature. Mission Hill: The Complete Series. Warner Bros. Home Entertainment.</ref> MacMullan states that final design chosen for Posey looked "much more attractive" when compared to the two alternate designs.

In mid-1998, the WB officially announced that a 13 episode first season would begin airing in the fall of 1999, with the project being known as The Downtowners at this point. MTV's production of the similarly titled adult animated series Downtown eventually forced a name change. When the series was first sold to the WB, it was not yet synonymous with teen female-oriented programs such as Dawson's Creek. Oakley claims, "In the time they ordered the show and the time it had appeared on the air, the network had redefined itself."  He adds, "they had this leftover programming, and by the time they figured out we shouldn’t be lumped in together [we] were in danger of killing that entire network. We hugely damaged the ratings of those other shows."

It featured the voices of Wallace Langham, Scott Menville, Brian Posehn, Vicki Lewis, Nick Jameson, Tom Kenny, Herbert Sigüenza, Jane Wiedlin, Tress MacNeille and Lisa Kushell. The theme song is a faster, instrumental version of "Italian Leather Sofa" by Cake, who Oakley and Weinstein were fans of. This version was specifically recorded for the show. Although 18 episodes were planned, only 13 were produced. The series was put on hiatus by The WB after two episodes due to poor ratings. It returned in the summer of 2000 with little promotion, and was canceled on July 18, 2000 after four more episodes aired to poor ratings. The series went on to develop a cult following, thanks to repeated airings of all 13 episodes on Teletoon's Teletoon Unleashed block; Cartoon Network's popular late-night programming block Adult Swim; and Too Funny To Sleep, a late-night programming block on TBS. Warner Home Video released all 13 completed episodes on DVD, on November 29, 2005. 

Bill Oakley has since voiced his dissatisfaction with the way Warner handled the series, and has said he doesn't mind if people pirate the series.

Potential revival
On June 30, 2020, Oakley announced plans for a spin-off tentatively titled Gus and Wally, which will focus on the elderly gay couple who were supporting characters in Mission Hill. It is set six months after the series' conclusion in the early 2000s, and will be produced by Warner Bros. Animation for contractual reasons, though it is unknown if it would be for the Warner-owned HBO Max. In June 2022, Oakley claimed that they were still in the process of pitching the project, and that if this version was picked up, then it would continue under the Mission Hill moniker, rather than being titled Gus and Wally. He also mentioned that it would include the unproduced episodes from the original incarnation of the show.

Premise
Set in the world of teens and 20-somethings, this series follows hip 24-year-old Andy French, whose sheltered suburban teenage brother Kevin moves in with him and his roommates in a big-city loft.

Characters

Main
 Andrew "Andy" French (Wallace Langham) – A 24-year-old in his third consecutive "post-college slump year." Andy is an aspiring cartoonist. From the pilot episode to "Unemployment, Part 1," Andy worked at a waterbed store where his boss was a lecherous, short, ill-tempered, foul-mouthed man who frequented strip clubs. From "Unemployment, Part 2" to "Plan 9 from Mission Hill" (and including the unproduced episodes "Supertool" and "Pretty in Pink"), Andy works as an artist at the same advertising agency as Jim. Often bored and mellow, Andy is easily annoyed by his younger brother, Kevin, though it has been shown that Andy does indeed care about him. However, he often has a habit of calling him and others "douchebag".
 Kevin French (Scott Menville) – Andy's 17-year-old nerd brother. Kevin moved in with Andy when his parents left for Wyoming, bringing his sheltered, suburban mindset to Mission Hill.  He hopes to attend Yale University, and prides himself on his SAT scores.  He has a habit of "bling-blonging", saying "bling blong" over and over again while doing homework to drown out any/all distractions and is prone to heavily overreact to trivial matters. Actor Andy Dick also auditioned for this role and was nearly cast.
 James "Jim" Kuback (Brian Posehn) – In his mid-20s, loftmate Jim has been Andy's best friend since high school. He is extremely tall and lanky, with red hair and a beard much like his voice actor, and speaks in a deep, monotone voice. Jim is a genius at all things electronic, whether it's electronic music or computers. He is mellow and able to express a wide variety of sentiments by nuancing the word "Okay." Jim is a high-powered advertising agent who is paid vast amounts of money to alter marketing campaigns to appeal to Generation Y.
 Posey Tyler (Vicki Lewis) – In her mid 20s, Posey, the fourth hippie loftmate, is somewhat a flower child, and very concerned about the health and well-being of her plants. She often gives her vegetables to charity, but gets upset when they are damaged. She often speaks quickly and in a nervous tone.
 Stogie – Andy's pet Golden Retriever, who can apparently stomach anything from alcohol drinks to remote controls. At one point in the series his primary source of food was eating the couch cushions. Posey has stated that "there are dark forces at work within him", in the first episode.

Supporting
 Gus Duncz (Nick Jameson) – A gay man in his late 60s, he owns a diner in Mission Hill. He is a very large, burly man with a short temper and is married to Wally.  According to audio commentary by the producers, Gus is based on Broderick Crawford, though according to the audio commentary for The Simpsons seventh season episode, "Marge Be Not Proud," Bill Oakley and Josh Weinstein claim the inspiration for the character was Lawrence Tierney (who voiced the Try-N-Save store detective who catches Bart shoplifting).
 Wally Langford (Tom Kenny) – A gay man in his late 60s, Wally is a projectionist at the local art movie house. He enjoys cinema and ragtime music. In the episode "I Married a Gay Man from Outer Space", it is revealed that he directed a film in the 1950s entitled The Man from Pluto (which parodied Plan 9 from Outer Space). It starred his partner Gus in the title role. The character was based on David Niven and Wally Cox.
 Natalie Leibowitz-Hernandez (Vicki Lewis) – Late 20s. Politically correct and intellectually well-endowed, Natalie is a professor of Women's Studies at the local college. Sensitive to biases in our culture, Natalie and her husband have yet to name their baby as they want it to have cultural significance reflective of their own respective cultures. She is of Jewish religion. She is a working mother who supports both "Baby Nameless" and her non-working "marital partner" Carlos. The character of Natalie was based and modeled on the writer and educator Lois M. Leveen, a longtime friend of the show's creators. She auditioned for the voice of her own character, but the actress Vicki Lewis was determined to be even more "Lois-y" than Lois Leveen herself, and she was cast in the role instead. Baby Nameless was modelled after and voiced by Bill Oakley's daughter Mary, who was born while the show was being created.
 Carlos Hernandez (Herbert Sigüenza) – Late 20s. He is a struggling Latino artist and stay-at-home dad for Baby Nameless. Unlike his wife Natalie, Carlos is a Christian, his work is, at times, reminiscent of Jackson Pollock, Diego Rivera and Bob Ross. He prides himself on having no discernible style. Carlos and Natalie have a pet snake as a result of an episode involving a raid on an animal testing lab.
 Gwen (Jane Wiedlin) – Early 20s. Andy's on-and-off girlfriend, Gwen completed two years of community college before settling in Mission Hill. She met Andy working at Ron's Waterbed World. Someday she would like to be an accomplished person who achieves her goals and makes a serious contribution to society. She likes The Go-Go's.
 Toby Mundorf (Josh Weinstein) – In his late teens and one of Kevin's best friends in Mission Hill. His overprotective mother worries a great deal about him, as he frequently suffers from allergies, asthma, and hunger. Despite his large size, he is a born coward.
  George Bang (Bill Oakley) – Kevin's other best friend. George works long hours after school in his father's market. George is extremely competitive in everything from taking tests to playing video games. He shares all the same interests as his best friends and is particularly proud of owning the complete Babylon 5 Collectible Card Game. Unlike his friends Toby and Kevin, his parents don't seem to be overprotective, so he is more sarcastic and aggressive than either of them. George has an older sister named Tina who goes to Polytech. George is of Korean descent.
 Ron (Nick Jameson) – A sleazy, immoral Armenian man and former boss of Andy (who loathes him). On "Unemployment, Part 1," Ron was arrested and sentenced to five years imprisonment for tax evasion, his store was also confiscated by the government as a result. He has an extremely short temper and often takes his rage out on his employees.

Episodes
Note: Thirteen episodes of the series were produced while five more were written, but never completed. Animatics for some of these episodes were in production at the time of the series' cancellation. It was planned to put these animatics on the DVD for the series, but this never came to fruition. However, several of the animatics—including a completed video animatic and synchronized audio read-through of the episode "Pretty in Pink (Crap Gets in Your Eyes)"—have been released through various internet outlets.

Unfinished episodes

Location
The series takes place in a district called Mission Hill. Mission Hill is a diverse neighborhood in a much larger city called Cosmopolis. Cosmopolis is depicted as a large modern urban metropolis similar to New York City or Chicago. The official website states Mission Hill is a mix of Mission Hill in Boston (only miles away from where creator Bill Oakley went to college), Mission District in San Francisco, Silver Lake in Los Angeles, Wicker Park in Chicago, and Williamsburg in Brooklyn. The exact location of Cosmopolis has never been revealed, as it is a mix of East and West Coast cities. Most of the series takes place in the neighborhood of Mission Hill, although the skyscrapers of Downtown Cosmopolis are seen in the background. In the DVD commentaries, Josh Weinstein says that a large portion of the development of the series was spent developing Mission Hill into a functional, albeit fictional, city. Writers and animators worked together to create fictional advertisements, bands, foods, and even bus schedules. Boston, MA has a neighborhood called Mission Hill in the Roxbury section of the city which bears many similarities to its fictional counterpart.

Home release

Warner Home Video released all 13 completed episodes on DVD on November 29, 2005. The collection replaced some of the original soundtracks with stock music, most glaringly "Everybody Hurts" by R.E.M. in the episode "Andy Vs. The Real World". The DVD collection also dubbed over some of the original voice tracks to remove any references to the replaced music, for example changing Andy's voice track from saying "Gordon Lightfoot" to "Scott Joplin" in the episode "Unemployment Part 1".

AwardsMission Hill'' received the 2000 Pulcinella Award for "Best Series for All Audiences"; the award cited the series' "stylized design and honest approach to sexual and moral issues."

The series won an award from GLAAD for its positive portrayal of a gay relationship.

See also

 Cult television

Notes

References

External links

 

1990s American adult animated television series
1990s American LGBT-related animated television series
1990s American LGBT-related comedy television series
1990s American sitcoms
1999 American television series debuts
2000s American adult animated television series
2000s American LGBT-related animated television series
2000s American LGBT-related comedy television series
2000s American sitcoms
2002 American television series endings
American adult animated comedy television series
American adult animated drama television series
American animated sitcoms
English-language television shows
Television series by Film Roman
The WB original programming
Gay-related television shows
American television series revived after cancellation
Television series by Castle Rock Entertainment
Television series by Warner Bros. Television Studios
Television series created by Bill Oakley and Josh Weinstein